Al-Karimah (also spelled Karto al-Karimeh) is a small town in northwestern Syria, administratively part of the Tartus Governorate. It is located in the Akkar Plain just north of the border with Lebanon and southeast of al-Hamidiyah. According to the Syria Central Bureau of Statistics (CBS), al-Karimah had a population of 3,461 in the 2004 census. It is the administrative center of the Karimah Subdistrict (nahiyah) which consisted of 12 localities with a collective population of 17,271. Its inhabitants are predominantly Alawites.

References

Populated places in Tartus District
Towns in Syria
Alawite communities in Syria